Nicola de Nicoli (active second half of 17th-century) was an Italian painter. He was a pupil of Giacomo Apollonio, and active in Bassano del Grappa, painting mainly religious subjects. In 1668, he painted a St Ignatius of Loyola for the Cathedral of Bassano. he painted a San Nicola with child Jesus for the chapel of San Nicola da Tolentino in the church of Santa Caterina of Bassano.

References

Year of birth unknown
Year of death unknown
17th-century Italian painters
Italian male painters
People from Bassano del Grappa
Italian Baroque painters